Randy Mueller (born June 3, 1961) is an American football executive who currently serves as the director of pro personnel for the Seattle Sea Dragons of the XFL. He previously served as the general manager for the National Football League's Miami Dolphins and New Orleans Saints, along with the Alliance of American Football's Salt Lake Stallions. He has over two decades of NFL front office experience.

Early years
Born and raised in St. Maries, Idaho, Mueller played quarterback at St. Maries High School and  Linfield College in McMinnville, Oregon. As a senior in 1982, he led his team to the NAIA Division II national championship and was named Most Valuable Player of the title game.

Professional career

Seattle Seahawks
Mueller began his front office career in 1983 as an assistant in pro personnel with the Seattle Seahawks. He was promoted the position of Pro Personnel Director in 1990 — a position he held until 1995. At that time he was promoted to Vice President of Football Operations and held that post through 1999. First he traded quarterback Rick Mirer to the Chicago Bears for a first round pick, then Mueller selected Florida State offensive tackle Walter Jones with the sixth-overall pick in the 1997 NFL Draft.

New Orleans Saints and ESPN
In 2000, Mueller became General Manager of Football Operations for the New Orleans Saints. During his first year with the team, the Saints won the NFC West title and went on to win their first playoff game in franchise history. As a result, he was named Sporting News NFL Executive of the Year in 2000.

In 2002, Mueller traded running back Ricky Williams and the team's fourth-round selection in the 2002 NFL Draft to the Miami Dolphins in exchange for their first- and fourth-round picks in 2002 and a conditional third-round pick in the 2003 NFL Draft, which became a first-round pick after Williams ran for over 1,800 yards in his first season with the Dolphins.

From 2002 to 2005, Mueller served as an NFL analyst for ESPN.

Miami Dolphins
On June 6, 2005 Mueller was hired as the general manager for the Miami Dolphins. Because then head coach Nick Saban had the final say on all roster moves, unlike most NFL general managers Mueller did not have control over player personnel decisions. After Saban's departure in January 2007, Mueller's authority increased as he took over responsibility for player personnel decisions. Mueller was also heavily involved in the team's search for its next head coach and eventual hiring of San Diego Chargers offensive coordinator Cam Cameron. On June 26, 2007 Mueller signed a contract extension that was expected to keep him with the team as general manager through at least 2009. Mueller was also to receive a salary adjustment, details of which were not publicly unavailable. On December 31, 2007 ESPN.com reported that Bill Parcells had fired Mueller.

San Diego/Los Angeles Chargers
Mueller joined the San Diego Chargers on April 29, 2008 as senior executive.

Alternative football leagues
In 2018, Mueller was hired by the Salt Lake Stallions of the newly-created Alliance of American Football (AAF). After the AAF folded, he joined another fledgling league in the XFL, becoming the Houston Roughnecks' director of pro personnel in 2019and later with the Seattle Dragons in 2022.

Personal
Mueller and his wife Lori have a daughter named Riley. His younger brother, Rick Mueller, is a longtime professional football executive, most recently with the Philadelphia Eagles.<ref>{{Cite web |url=http://www.goccusports.com/sports/m-footbl/mtt/rick_mueller_1066310.html |title="/>

References

1961 births
Living people
American football quarterbacks
Linfield Wildcats football players
Los Angeles Chargers executives
Miami Dolphins executives
National Football League general managers
New Orleans Saints executives
Seattle Seahawks executives
San Diego Chargers executives
People from St. Maries, Idaho
Players of American football from Idaho